"Ten Years Time" is a song by English singer Gabrielle. It was written by Gabrielle and Jonathan Shorten for her fourth studio album Play to Win (2004), while production was handled by Shorten. The second and final commercial single from album, it became Gabrielle's first single to miss the top forty of the UK Singles Chart, peaking at number 43, only spending a week inside the top 75. Irish singer-songwriter, Robert O'Connor, released a cover version of "Ten Years Time" as part of a double A-side single with the original composition "Spend the Night" in November 2006 in the UK and Ireland.

Track listings

CD: 1 (UK)

CD: 2 (Germany) 

Promo CD (EU)

Charts

References

2004 singles
2004 songs
Gabrielle (singer) songs
Go! Beat singles
Songs written by Gabrielle (singer)
Songs written by Jonathan Shorten